The Murrumbidgee River railway bridge is a former railway bridge that carried the Main Southern railway line across the Murrumbidgee River in Wagga Wagga, Australia. The original bridge, erected in 1881, was replaced in 2006.

Original bridge
The original four span wrought iron lattice truss bridge opened on 16 January 1881. It was the second oldest bridge out of the twelve related wrought iron lattice truss series bridges built in Australia. The bridge was considered as of major importance to the history of bridge engineering in Australia.

The spans were manufactured by P. & W. McClellan & Co., Glasgow weighing a combined . The northern approach was originally built with 215 timber trestles. These were replaced with steel trestles over a four-year period from 1897.  The trestles were strengthened in 1994 as part of the One Nation project. By 2000 a  speed restriction over the bridge had been imposed.

Replacement bridge
The bridge was removed and replaced with a new concrete bridge during a four-day shut down from 30 December 2006. The wrought iron lattice railway bridge was cut away using oxy cutters. One cut section of the bridge was donated to railway preservation group Tumbarail at Ladysmith. The rest of the bridge was taken to Port Kembla for disposal. The new bridge allowed an  speed limit to be introduced.

Engineering heritage award 
The bridge received a Historic Engineering Marker from Engineers Australia as part of its Engineering Heritage Recognition Program.

See also

List of railway bridges in New South Wales

References

External links

Bridges completed in 1881
Concrete bridges
Crossings of the Murrumbidgee River
Lattice truss bridges
Railway bridges in New South Wales
Truss bridges in Australia
Wagga Wagga
New South Wales places listed on the defunct Register of the National Estate
History of Wagga Wagga
Wagga Wagga
Main Southern railway line, New South Wales
1881 establishments in Australia
2006 disestablishments in Australia
Former railway bridges in Australia
Recipients of Engineers Australia engineering heritage markers